Megachile bahamensis is a species of bee in the family Megachilidae. It was described by Mitchell in 1927.

Distribution 
Southern Florida and the Bahamas from March to October.

References

Bahamensis
Insects described in 1927